Law and Order is a 1932 American pre-Code Western film starring Walter Huston, Harry Carey, Andy Devine, Russell Hopton and Russell Simpson. It was the first movie to depict the Gunfight at the O.K. Corral, in Tombstone, Arizona.

The film is based on the novel Saint Johnson, by W. R. Burnett. Walter Huston plays the part of lawman Frame Johnson, a fictionalized version of Wyatt Earp, and Russell Hopton plays his brother Luther Johnson. One of the best early Westerns in its character development, Law and Order features a script by John Huston, Walter's soon-to-be-famous son, and Tom Reed, who provided dialog for many movies in the 1930s and 1940s. Because of changes made during the film's production, all scenes involving the actress Lois Wilson were cut prior to the film's release.

Cast
Walter Huston as Frame Johnson
Harry Carey as Ed Brandt 
Russell Hopton as Luther Johnson 
Raymond Hatton as Deadwood
Ralph Ince as Poe Northrup
Harry Woods as Walt Northrup  
Richard Alexander as Kurt Northrup 
Russell Simpson as Judge R.W. Williams 
Andy Devine as Johnny Kinsman 
Hank Bell as Barfly (uncredited) 
Walter Brennan as Lanky Smith (uncredited) 
Nelson McDowell as Parker Brother (uncredited)

References

External links

1932 films
1930s English-language films
1932 Western (genre) films
Films based on American novels
Films based on works by W. R. Burnett
Films directed by Edward L. Cahn
American Western (genre) films
American black-and-white films
Cultural depictions of Wyatt Earp
Universal Pictures films
Revisionist Western (genre) films
1930s American films